John Stewart "George" Lowden (29 May 1877 – 7 October 1958) was a British stamp dealer who was involved in a number of cases of suspected stamp forgery and eventually jailed for three years for that offence at the Old Bailey in 1913.

See also
 Jonas Lek

References

Stamp forgers
British stamp dealers
1877 births
1958 deaths
Businesspeople from Leeds
Criminals from Yorkshire